Aleksandr Nikolayevich Dryagin (born 24 May 1972) is a former bandy player who most recently played for Skutskärs IF as a midfielder. Alexander was brought up by Seversky Trubnik.  Alexander played for the Russian national bandy team in the 1994–95 season but now plays for the Kazakhstanian national bandy team, who he made his debut for in the 2002–03 season.

External links

Kazakhstani bandy players
Living people
1972 births
SKA-Sverdlovsk players
Surte BK players
Vetlanda BK players
Helenelunds IK players
Zorky Krasnogorsk players
Sandvikens AIK players
Uralsky Trubnik players
Skutskärs IF players
Expatriate bandy players in Sweden
Elitserien (bandy) players
People from Polevskoy
Sportspeople from Sverdlovsk Oblast